Hazlov is a municipality and village in Cheb District in the Karlovy Vary Region of the Czech Republic. It has about 1,500 inhabitants.

Administrative parts
Villages of Lipná, Polná, Skalka, Vlastislav and Výhledy are administrative parts of Hazlov.

Geography
It lies in the Aš Panhandle region, on the border with Germany. The Czech-German border is on the northeast and on the west. The Hazlovský Stream flows through the municipality. The source of the White Elster river is located in the northernmost part of the municipal territory.

History
The first written mention of Hazlov is from 1224, when Bedřich of Hazlov was mentioned. He probably had built the castle in the village. The Lords of Hazlov owned the village until 1401, when it bought Mikuláš Jur of Cheb. Other owners of the village were the Landwüst family from 1450, the Kocov family from 1579, the Dětřichov family, and for a short time the Nostitz family. The next owners were the Moser family (1683–1795), who had rebuilt and extended the castle. The last noble owners of the castle were the Helmfeld family (1853–1945).

Until the end of the 18th century, Hazlov was mostly an agricultural village. From the 19th century, the textile industry developed in the whole Aš region, including Hazlov. The first textile factory was opened in 1822.

Demographics

Sights

The landmark of Hazlov is the Church of the Exaltation of the Holy Cross. The current building was built on the site of a demolished church in the Baroque style in 1687–1688.

The church is surrounded by the ruin of the Hazlov Castle. The originally Romanesque castle from the 13th century was rebuilt in the Gothic style, then it was rebuilt in the late Baroque and Neoclassical style in the 1780s. The last modifications were made by the Helmfeld family after 1853. After the World War II it began to decay and today it is a ruin, owned by the municipality.

The Church of Saint George is a small cemetery church from 1666.

Gallery

References

External links

 
Villages in Cheb District